Karl Fridlin (born 19 May 1935) is a Swiss former freestyle swimmer who competed in two events at the 1960 Summer Olympics. From 1969 until his retirement, he managed the family company J. C. Fridlin Gewürze Ltd., a swiss producer of premium spices.

References

External links
 

1935 births
Living people
Swiss male freestyle swimmers
Olympic swimmers of Switzerland
Swimmers at the 1960 Summer Olympics
People from Zug
Sportspeople from the canton of Zug